The Ejercito family is a Filipino acting and political family.

List of members

 Emilio Ejército (1898–1977), an engineer who became the first sanitary engineer of the City of Manila.
 ∞ married María Marcelo (1905-2009); they had ten children:
 Paulino (1929-2009)
 Patrocinio (born 1932)
 Antonio (1934-2004)
 Connie (born 1934)
 Marita (born 1937)
 Joseph Estrada 13th president of the Philippines 
 ∞ married Loi Ejercito, first lady turned senator, and had three children:
 Jinggoy Estrada, an actor and former senator
 ∞ married Ma. Presentacion Vitug; they have four children:
 Janella Marie Ejercito
 Jolo Estrada, an actor
 Julian Estrada, an actor and DJ
 Julienne Ejercito, voice actor
 Jackie Ejercito  
 ∞ married Beaver Lopez (annulled)
 Jude Ejercito 
 ∞ Rowena Ocampo
 with former actress Peachy Osorio, had:
 Joel Eduardo Ejercito
 Teresita Ejercito
 with Guia Gomez, former mayor of San Juan, had:
 JV Ejercito, former senator
 ∞ married Hyacinth Lotuaco; they have;
 Julio Jose Ejercito
 with Larena
 fathered Jason Ejercito
 with former actress, Laarni Enriquez, had:
 Jerika Ejercito
 Jake Ejercito
 with Andi Eigenmann, fathered
 Ellie
 Jacob Ejercito
 with Joy Melendrez had;
 Joma Ejercito
 George Estregan
 ∞ married Ramona Pelayo, and had:
 E.R. Ejercito, an actor and director
 ∞ married Maita Sanchez, they have four children:
 Eric Ejercito 
 Jet Ejercito 
 Jerico Ejercito 
 Jhulia Ejercito 
 Maria Georgina Ejercito
 Kurt Joseph Ejercito
 George Gerald Ejercito
 with actress and model Agnes Moran had:
 Gary Estrada, a congressman and actor
 ∞ married actress Bernadette Allyson; and they have:
 Garielle Bernice Ejercito
 Garianna Beatrice Ejercito
 Gianna Bettina Ejercito
 with actress Cheska Diaz had:
 Kiko Estrada who is also an actor
 Kate Gomez, an actress, mother of
 Rob Gomez who is also an actor
 fathered former professional basketball player Gherome Ejercito
 Jesús (born 1944)

References 

Ejercito family
Show business families of the Philippines
Political families of the Philippines